Twelve special routes of U.S. Route 63 currently exist. Arkansas and Missouri each contain five, with two in Iowa. There are also five former routings that have been removed from the system.

Hermitage business route

U.S. Route 63 Business (US 63B and Hwy. 63B) is a  business route of U.S. Route 63 in the small town of Hermitage, Arkansas.

Route description
US 63B begins at US 63 in Hermitage in South Arkansas. Highway 160 also comes into this junction along US 63, turning south at the junction. US 63B runs north as Main Street, passing through the commercial district of the town before turning right onto Grand Avenue. Now running east, US 63B passes one block north of the historic Hermitage City Hall and Jail and Hermitage Volunteer Fire Department before continuing east and terminating at US 63.

History
The designation was created by the Arkansas State Highway Commission along a former segment of US 63 on January 11, 2000.

Major intersections

Warren business route

U.S. Route 63 Business (US 63B and Hwy. 63B) is a  business route of U.S. Route 63 in Warren, the county seat of Bradley County, Arkansas.

Route description

The route's southern terminus is at US 63 at the northern city limits of Warren. The junction also serves as the northern terminus of Highway 189. US 63B runs south as Myrtle Street (past Warren High School) until turning onto Bond Street near the Davis-Adams House, listed on the National Register of Historic Places (NRHP). After one block, the route turns south onto Main Street and runs through downtown Warren. Passing historic structures, including the Bradley County Courthouse and Clerk's Office, Blankinship Motor Company Building, Warren Post Office, and the Ederington House (all NRHP listed). Between Church Street and Central Street the highway overlaps with US 278B. After the Central Street intersection, US 63B runs south to terminate at its parent route.

History
The route was created by the Arkansas State Highway Commission as Highway 15 Business (AR 15B) along a former alignment of AR 15 following completion of a bypass around downtown Warren. Shortly thereafter, the route was renumbered to US 63B when US 63 supplanted AR 15 as part of an extension south from West Memphis to Ruston, Louisiana; approved by AASHTO on October 2, 1999. 

Major intersections

Bono business route

Route description
US 63B begins at US 63 at the southern edge of the small town of Bono in the Arkansas Delta. The roadway continues northwesterly, paralleling the BNSF Railway tracks through a commercial part of town. US 63B serves as the eastern terminus of Highway 230 (Church Street) near the center of town before continuing northwest to terminate at the parent route.

History
US 63B was created in Bono along a former alignment of US 63 following construction of a new bypass to the west of town. The Arkansas State Highway Commission created the designation on November 17, 2004, and the designation was approved by the American Association of State Highway and Transportation Officials (AASHTO) on May 29, 2014.

Major intersections

Hoxie business route

Route description

US 63B begins at US 63 in Walnut Ridge, a small city on Crowley's Ridge in Northeast Arkansas. The two-lane road runs northwest, paralleling the BNSF Railway tracks and crossing under a freeway segment of US 67 (with no connection) before entering Hoxie as Lindsey Street. After passing through a residential section, US 63B crosses the Union Pacific Railroad tracks before intersecting AR 367; the two routes form a concurrency southbound as Texas Street for four blocks. The concurrency ends at Hartigan Road (a one-way pair), US 63B turns northwest and passes Hoxie High School and the Hoxie School District administration offices. The route curves to again parallel the BNSF railroad tracks before a junction with US 63, where it terminates.

History
The Arkansas State Highway Commission created the US 63B designation in Hoxie on May 13, 1998. The designation was established following completion of a bypass around the town, with US 63 rerouted onto the bypass and US 63B created along former US 63 through downtown.

Major intersections
Mileage reflects northbound travel.

Hardy business route

U.S. Highway 63 Business (US 63B, Hwy. 63B, and Main Street) is a business route in Hardy, Arkansas.

Route description

US 63B begins near the western city limits of Hardy at US 63 and runs east toward the Spring River as Main Street concurrently with US 62/US 412. Shortly after beginning, US 63B has a junction ending the US 62/US 412 concurrency; US 63B continues eastbound alone into the Hardy Downtown Historic District. The highway intersects Spring Street (former AR 175) and parallels the BNSF Railroad and Spring River, passing through downtown Hardy and the historic Lee Weaver House. East of downtown, US 63B passes a historic residential section of homes with notable vernacular architecture, including the Sherman Bates House, Sherman and Merlene Bates House, Carrie Tucker House, Fred Graham House, and the Web Long House and Motel before intersecting US 62/US 63/US 412, where it terminates.

History
The Arkansas State Highway Commission created the designation in 2006 along US 63 through downtown Hardy following construction of a bypass of the town, with the US 63 designation moving onto the new terrain route. The change was approved by the American Association of State Highway and Transportation Officials on November 20, 2014.

Major intersections

West Plains business route

U.S. Highway 63 Business is a business route in West Plains, Missouri. As the road starts to turn to the west around Grace Ave., the road changes names to East Main St., passing by Ozark Action. The station is at the corner of Porter Wagoner Blvd. and Broadway. Crossing Washington Ave near Court Square, the road changes names again to Broadway.

Willow Springs business route

U.S. Highway 63 Business is a business route in Willow Springs, Missouri, and coincides with Business US 60.

Columbia connector route

A connector highway exists in Columbia, Missouri. This route begins/ends at US 63 and intersects Interstate 70 and Interstate 70 Business.

Moberly business route

U.S. Highway 63 Business is a business route in Moberly, Missouri.

Kirksville business route

U.S. Highway 63 Business is a business route in Kirksville, Missouri.

Ottumwa business route

U.S. Highway 63 Business is a business route in Ottumwa, Iowa.

New Hampton business route

U.S. Highway 63 Business is a business route in New Hampton, Iowa.

Former routings

Pine Bluff business route

U.S. Route 63 Business (US 63B and Hwy. 63B) is a former  business route of US 63 in Pine Bluff, Arkansas.

Route description
The route began at Exit 43 on I-530/US 79; where US 63 joins the freeway eastbound and the northbound Olive Street continuing as US 63B. Olive Street runs north, bridging Bayou Bartholomew and entering a residential section of the city. It passed the historic McDonald's Store #433 Sign, as well as the Puddephatt House and Howson House before turning onto Harding Avenue and then to Main Street. It turned onto 8th Street, entering the Pine Bluff Commercial Historic District and passing the George Howard Jr. Federal Building and United States Courthouse, Arts and Science Center for Southeast Arkansas, the Pine Bluff Civic Center, and the Pine Bluff Convention Center. US 63B next turned onto Convention Center Drive and briefly overlapping Highway 190 (5th Avenue/6th Avenue, a one-way pair) and crossing the Union Pacific Railway tracks before turning onto US 65B (Martha Mitchell Expressway) eastbound. US 63B followed US 65B until an intersection with US 63/US 79, where US 63B terminated

History
The route was created by renumbering Highway 15 Business (AR 15B) when US 63 supplanted AR 15 as part of an extension south from West Memphis to Ruston, Louisiana; approved by AASHTO on October 2, 1999. The designation was deleted in November 2020; with the segment along Olive Street between I-530 and Harding Street becoming a new segment of Highway 463.

Major intersections

Hazen spur

Route description
US 63S began at US 63 in Hazen, a small town on the Arkansas Grand Prairie. The route ran west as North Front Street through a residential area, paralleling the former Chicago, Rock Island and Pacific Railroad tracks, since converted to the Hazen Trail and the Railroad Prairie Natural Area. US 63B continued west past the historic Rock Island Depot before turning left onto Livermore Street and terminating at US 70 (South Front Street) in downtown Hazen. 

History
The roadway was previously part of Highway 11 (AR 11), and was later redesignated Highway 11 Spur. The US 63B designation replaced AR 11S when US 63 supplanted AR 11 as part of an extension south from West Memphis to Ruston, Louisiana; approved by AASHTO on October 2, 1999. On February 6, 2008, the Arkansas State Highway Commission relinquished control of the roadway to local maintenance.

Major intersections

Marked Tree business route

Route description
US 63B began at an exit along I-555/US 63 and the northern terminus of AR 149 in Marked Tree, a small town in the Arkansas Delta. It ran northeast as 10th Street to turn onto Frisco Street, with the roadway continuing straight as AR 308 toward the Marked Tree Municipal Airport. Now paralleling the BNSF Railway tracks, the route passed through the Marked Tree Commercial Historic District, the historic commercial center of the city, before an intersection with Gayosa Street. US 63B turned left onto Gayosa Street, beginning an concurrency with AR 14, with AR 140 beginning eastward from this junction. US 63B/AR 14 continued southwest together over the St. Francis River to I-555/US 63, where US 63B terminated.

History
Mainline US 63 was rerouted onto the bypass with US 63B designated along the former alignment through downtown Marked Tree. It was deleted on May 20, 2019 when US 63 was rerouted to overlap US 49 between Brinkley and Jonesboro, thus removing US 63 from Interstate 555 (I-555), which it had overlapped between West Memphis and Jonesboro.

Major intersections
This table reflects the highway's junctions upon decommissioning.

Trumann city route

Route description
The US 63C designation began at US 63 (now AR 463 in Trumann, a small town in Northeast Arkansas. It ran northeast along Melton Avenue before curving northwest and paralleling the St. Louis–San Francisco Railway (Frisco) railroad tracks. The highway designation turned onto Oak Street through a residential area before turning onto Pine Street for one block, then onto Speedway Street to again parallel the Frisco railroad before terminating at an intersection with US 63. The roadway continued west as AR 69.

History
The Arkansas General Assembly passed the Act 148 of 1957, the Milum Road Act, creating 10–12 miles (16–19 km) of new state highways in each county. The City of Trumann requested the Arkansas State Highway Commission add this segment to the state highway system as a city truck route, however adding routes within municipalities was not permitted initially. Following a change in policy, Trumann again requested the route's addition, which was granted on March 4, 1959. US 63C was deleted on October 28, 1970, with the segment between US 63 (now AR 463) and Pine Avenue becoming an extension of AR 69 and the remainder becoming a city street.

Major intersections

Jonesboro business route

U.S. Highway 63 Business was a  business route of U.S. Route 63 in Craighead County. The route ran through downtown Jonesboro until being redesignated Arkansas Highway 91 on October 27, 2006.

Route description
US 63 BUS ran northwest from US 63 to meet AR 18. US 63 BUS/AR 18 became Highland Drive east across US 49/AR 1 and north with AR 141 (former US 49 BUS). The route ran west as Dan Ave. to terminate at US 63.

References

63
U.S. Route 63
63
63
S63